Show Your Colors is the fourth studio album by Finnish metal band Amoral.

Background
Amoral's fourth studio album was announced in November 2008 when the band announced Ari Koivunen as their new front man. On January 21, their first single was put up the band's MySpace account. The first single is entitled Year of the Suckerpunch and the song is clearly distinctive from any of Amoral's previous material, and is built around Ari's higher pitched, clean, melodic voice, as opposed to former vocalist Niko Kalliojärvi's growling death metal vocals. The album was released May 6, 2009.

Track listing

Personnel

Amoral
 Ari Koivunen - vocals, backing vocals
 Ben Varon - guitar
 Silver Ots - guitar
 Juhana Karlsson - drums
 Pekka Johansson - bass

Additional
 Janne Saksa - recording, producing, backing vocals
 Svante Forsbäck- mastering
 Mika Latvala - piano (10)

Release history

References

External links
Amoral's official website
Spinefarm Records website
Amoral´s MySpace Page
Amoral Street Teams´s MySpace Page
Amoral´s Youtube videos

2009 albums
Amoral (band) albums